The 1987 Virginia Cavaliers football team represented the University of Virginia during the 1987 NCAA Division I-A football season. The Cavaliers were led by sixth-year head coach George Welsh and played their home games at Scott Stadium in Charlottesville, Virginia. They competed as members of the Atlantic Coast Conference, finishing in second. Virginia was invited to the 1987 All-American Bowl in Birmingham, Alabama, where they defeated BYU.

Schedule

Roster

References

Virginia
Virginia Cavaliers football seasons
All-American Bowl champion seasons
Virginia Cavaliers football